Shimla railway station is a small railway station in Shimla in the Indian state of Himachal Pradesh. The station is the terminus of the UNESCO World Heritage Site Kalka–Shimla Railway. It was allotted the railway code of SML under the jurisdiction of Ambala railway division. The -wide narrow-gauge Kalka-Shimla Railway was constructed by Delhi–Ambala–Kalka Railway Company and opened for traffic in 1903.

History

The station opened in 1903.
Originally, the walls of the station building were made of wood with a sloping galvanised iron roof, but due to the growth in traffic it was rebuilt and extended in 1921 with a new double storey brick masonry (plastered in lime mortar) building housing the offices of the station master, staff and control, accident relief arrangements, waiting rooms, telegraph office and shelters. After the roof over the platform collapsed in 1944 due to a heavy snowfall a new roof over the station building and platform was built.

In 1986–87 the station was redeveloped with end-to-end platform shelters, while the platform was resurfaced and various services refurbished or rebuilt such as the tourist information office, railway telephone exchange, platform ticketing office, reservation office while 10 new retiring rooms (each having large windows providing a valley view) were installed and a waiting hall provided on the ground floor.

Originating Trains

References

Railway stations in Shimla district
Ambala railway division
Railway terminus in India
Mountain railways in India
Transport in Shimla